The 1994 BVV Prague Open was a women's tennis tournament played on outdoor clay courts at the I. Czech Lawn Tennis Club in Prague in the Czech Republic that was part of Tier IV of the 1994 WTA Tour. It was the second edition of the  tournament and was held from 10 May until 15 May 1994. First-seeded Amanda Coetzer won the singles title.

Finals

Singles

 Amanda Coetzer defeated  Åsa Carlsson 6–1, 7–6(16–14)
 It was Coetzer's 1st singles title of the year and the 3rd of her career.

Doubles

 Amanda Coetzer /  Linda Harvey-Wild defeated  Kristie Boogert /  Laura Golarsa 6–4, 3–6, 6–2
 It was Coetzer's 1st doubles title of the year and the 3rd of her career. It was Harvey-Wild's 2nd doubles title of the year and of her career.

See also
 1994 Skoda Czech Open – men's tournament

References

External links
 WTA tournament draws

1994 WTA Tour
1994 in Czech tennis